This is a list of all the United States Supreme Court cases from volume 549 of the United States Reports:

External links

2006 in United States case law
2007 in United States case law